Estadio Nacional was a multi-use stadium in the Colonia Roma Sur neighborhood of Mexico City, Mexico. It was built in 1923; the architect was José Villagrán García. It was mostly used for football and athletics and was used as the main stadium for the 1926 Central American and Caribbean Games.  It was replaced by the Estadio Olímpico Universitario in the Ciudad Universitaria, in the south of the city, in 1949, and the site was used for multifamily housing which was demolished after damage from the 1985 Mexico City earthquake. Today the site is a park, the Jardín Ramón López Velarde.  The capacity of the stadium was 30,000 spectators.

References

 Stadium history

Defunct football venues in Mexico
Sports venues in Mexico City
Colonia Roma
Sports venues completed in 1923
1923 establishments in Mexico